Imani may refer to:

People

Given name
 Imani (rapper) (born 1971), American rapper
 Imani Perry (born 1972), American interdisciplinary scholar of race, law, literature, and African-American culture
 Imani Sanga (born 1972), Tanzanian musicologist
 Imani Coppola (born 1978), American singer-songwriter and violinist
 Imani Patterson (born 1985), former African-American actor
 Imani Hakim (born 1993), American actress
 Imani Uzuri, African-American vocalist
 Imani Williams, British singer

Surname
 Blair Imani, African-American Muslim activist

Media
 Imani (film), 2010 Swedish/Ugandan film
Imani Firewing, a supporting character of Nickelodeon/Nick Toons 2017 show Mysticons

Organizations
 Imani Entertainment, American entertainment company
 Imani Temple African-American Catholic Congregation
 Imani Winds, American wind quintet

Arabic unisex given names